Darapsa myron, the Virginia creeper sphinx, is a moth of the  family Sphingidae found in central and eastern North America.

Distribution 
It is found in southern Ontario and Quebec in Canada, and in the United States is found from Maine south to south Florida; west to North Dakota, Nebraska, New Mexico, Oklahoma, and Texas. It also can be found in Mexico.

Description

Biology 
There are 20 or 3 broods in much of the range, and larvae can mature in as few as 3 weeks. Larvae hide on the midribs of their host leaves and are nocturnal feeders. During July and August, this species is abundant in many areas, particularly Massachusetts and Pennsylvania. Adults emerge in the mid-afternoon and females begin calling bob after dusk. In spring, adults are more likely to feed, nectaring from flowers and drinking fluids from rotting fruit. In areas where they are common, D. myron readily come to both lights and sugar baits, being most active between sunset and midnight. Females have much rounder abdomens while the end of the male's abdomen is spade-shaped. Pairing is fairly quick and captive adults do not need to be fed, although females lay more eggs when fed. Sometimes adults refuse food altogether.
Mated females deposit up to 150 small eggs that start out green but turn yellow within 48 hours, indicating fertility. Incubation lasts about 6 days. Full grown caterpillars poses the ability to chew though sleeves. Fully grown larvae turn a purplish brown before spinning a sparse, wiry cocoon among host leaves. Pupae either enclose within about 20 days or diapause, eclosing in late May.

The caterpillars are known to feed on virginia creeper, Ampelopsis, and grape.

Subspecies
Darapsa myron myron
Darapsa myron mexicana (Gehlen, 1933) (Mexico)

References

External links
 Virginia creeper sphinx Butterflies and Moths of North America
 Darapsa myron  Sphingidae of the Americas
 Moth Caterpillars Feeding on Virginia Creeper (Parthenocissus quinquefolia)

Macroglossini
Moths described in 1780
Moths of North America